Siddhanath Temple, located in Mhaswad, is dedicated to the veneration of Lord Siddhanath. Siddhanath is believed to be incarnation of Shiva (one of the principle deities of Hinduism) and the patron god of adjacent regions and one of among several regional protective (Kshetrapal) gods of Maharashtra. Mhaswad is situated in the bank of Manganga river.

Historically, maan region was once ruled by Chalukya of Badami. In the 11th century, chalukya rulers built this temple as it was considered to be there an ancestors god, letter in 1738 chalukya descendant Dubal of karad built other half of temple, From then onwards all rituals are performed in presence of Dubal family members. Later, this place was ruled by  Mane(माने), a Maratha Kshatriya 07 Kuli clan. The Mane were Noblemen & were considered as pillars of Maratha Empire. Sardar Nagoji Mane was one of the famous ruler's of mhaswad and Ally of {Chhatrapati Rajaram Bhonsle Maharaj}. Sardar Subhanji Mane who was son of Nagoji Mane had taken part in the war of Panipat against Abdali.

A fair of Lord Shree Siddhanath is celebrated Annually by the people over here. In this festival, a chariot of Shree Siddhanath is taken around the town by the devotees. Lord Shree Siddhanath Ratha Yatra is a Great annual town fair. Lakhs of people from all over India come to Mhaswad to celebrate this the festival and enjoy the fair.

See also 
Sidhhanath Temple, Kharsundi
Sidhhanath Temple, Bhood

Hindu temples in Maharashtra
Shiva temples in Maharashtra